Carl Sonny Leyland is an Anglo-American boogie woogie, blues and jazz pianist. He was born in 1965 near Southampton, England, but as a child was drawn to American music.  At age 15, he discovered boogie woogie, and was inspired to make the piano his career. He came to New Orleans in 1988, and built a reputation in the clubs there for the next nine years.  In 1997, he relocated to California, where he joined Big Sandy & His Flyrite Boys, a rockabilly and western swing group, touring with them for three years. Since then his repertoire has included ragtime and early jazz.  He formed the Carl Sonny Leyland Trio in 2003 with Hal Smith on drums (later replaced by Jeff Hamilton) and Marty Eggers on bass.  The trio plays primarily boogie woogie and traditional jazz. It has recorded seven CDs and performs regularly in festivals.

Leyland is regarded highly by critics and considered to be one of the top attractions at jazz festivals (“We cannot heap enough praise on Carl Sonny Leyland. Not only is he a great solo pianist, he is an asset to any band and amazes other musicians…”)

Discography
Carl Sonny Leyland Trio:
 Ready to Boogie
 The Carl Sonny Leyland Trio Meets Nathan James & Ben Hernandez
 The Carl Sonny Leland Trio
 Dang Good Boogie
 Railroad Boogie
 Studio Session

Solo:
 Stompin’ Upstairs
 Gin Mill Jazz
 Wild Piano

With the Joel Patterson Trio:
 A Chicago Session

References

External links
 Carl Sonny Leyland website

Living people
American jazz pianists
American male pianists
Boogie-woogie pianists
1965 births
English emigrants to the United States
Jazz musicians from New Orleans
People from Southampton (district)
20th-century American pianists
21st-century American pianists
20th-century American male musicians
21st-century American male musicians
American male jazz musicians